Austrochernes cruciatus is a species of pseudoscorpion in the subfamily Chernetinae. It was first described as Troglochernes cruciatus in 2007 by Erich Volschenk.

References 

Animals described in 2007
Chernetidae
Arachnids of Australia